The 1909–10 Dartmouth men's ice hockey season was the 5th season of play for the program.

Season
For its fifth season, Dartmouth played one of its worst years in team history. The Green lost their first seven games, only managing to win their final match, and scored a paltry 8 goals all season. A scheduled game against Cornell was postponed and later cancelled due to poor ice conditions. For the season Dartmouth had a new coach in Tom Hodge, a former defenseman with the Montreal Wanderers and the Montreal Hockey Club.

Note: Dartmouth College did not possess a moniker for its athletic teams until the 1920s, however, the university had adopted 'Dartmouth Green' as its school color in 1866.

Roster

Standings

Schedule and Results

|-
!colspan=12 style=";" | Regular Season

References

Dartmouth Big Green men's ice hockey seasons
Dartmouth
Dartmouth
Dartmouth
Dartmouth